Gabriele Berg (born 1963 in Potsdam, East Germany) is a biologist, biotechnologist and university lecturer in Environmental and Ecological Technology at the Technical University of Graz. Her research emphasis is on the development of sustainable methods of plant vitalisation with Bioeffectors and molecular analysis of microbial processes in the soil, particularly in the Rhizosphere.

Life and work 
After graduating from the Helmholtz-Gymnasium, Potsdam  in 1981 Frau Berg studied biology at the University of Rostock. She graduated with honours (1986) and then spent a research study year in Microbiology and Biotechnology at the University of Greifswald. In 1995 she obtained the qualification Dr. rer nat with "magna cum laude" and in 2001 the Venia Legendi for Microbiology with her dissertation Antagonistic Micro-organisms. In 2003 she was awarded a Heisenberg-Stipendium by the Deutschen Forschungsgemeinschaft (German Research Community). In 2005 she became the first female professor of natural science at the Graz University of Technology.

Memberships and affiliations 
Senate of the TU Graz
International Verticillium Steering Committee
Austrian Society for Biomedical Engineering (ÖGBMT), Vorsitz der Sektion Süd
Deutsche Phytomedizinische Gesellschaft (DPG – German Phytomedical Society), chairperson of the working group Biologische Bekämpfung (Biological Control, 2004–2012)
Editorial Board FEMS Microbial Ecology (2000–2010), MPMI, ISME Journal (2007–)

Field of interest 
Frau Berg‘s research is focused on the environmental biotechnology, in particular the development of sustainable biotechnological methods to improve the microbiological performance potential of soil that has been intensively used for agriculture, and for biological plant protection with plant fortifiers and Biostimulants.

Awards 
 Science2Business Award Austria
 ÖGUT Umweltpreis
 Fast Forward Award Styria

Publications 
Gabriele Berg has been an author on 289 publications which have been cited 31,000 times; her h-index is 92, there follows a small selection of this literature.

External links 
 Members of the Technischen Universität Graz

References

Living people
21st-century German biologists
1963 births
Scientists from Potsdam
University of Greifswald alumni
German women biologists